Kırkpınar is a Turkish oil-wrestling tournament, held annually since 1346.

Kırkpınar, Bayburt, a village in Bayburt Province, Turkey
Kırkpınar, Dicle
Kırkpınar, Korkuteli, a village in Antalya Province, Turkey
Kırkpınar, Emirdağ, a village in Afyonkarahisar Province, Turkey
Kırkpınar, Kayapınar